La Floresta can refer to:
 La Floresta, Quito, electoral parish in Quito, Ecuador
 La Floresta, Córdoba, town in Capital Department, Córdoba Province, Argentina
 La Floresta, Lleida, municipality in the province of Lleida, Catalonia, Spain
 La Floresta, Uruguay, beach resort in  Canelones Department, Uruguay
 La Floresta (Barcelona–Vallès Line), a train station in Sant Cugat del Vallès, Catalonia, Spain
 La Floresta railway station, a train station in La Floresta, Catalonia, Spain

See also
 Floresta (disambiguation)